P. P. Malhotra is a Senior Advocate at the Supreme Court of India. In 2004, he was appointed as Additional Solicitor General of India and continued in this post till May 2014.

Malhotra has practised law in trial courts of Delhi, Delhi High Court and the Supreme Court of India and remained counsel of Government of India for 12 years after being assigned the job in 1988.

References

20th-century Indian lawyers
Additional Solicitors General of India
Living people
Year of birth missing (living people)